Ihor Urbansky (born 16 July 1970 in Kiev, in the Ukrainian SSR of the Soviet Union) is a Ukrainian luger who competed in the mid to late 1990s. Competing in two Winter Olympics, he earned his best finish of seventh in the men's doubles event at Nagano in 1998.

References

External links
1994 luge men's doubles results
1998 luge men's doubles results

1970 births
Living people
Lugers at the 1994 Winter Olympics
Lugers at the 1998 Winter Olympics
Ukrainian male lugers
Olympic lugers of Ukraine
Sportspeople from Kyiv